The Kendal by-election was a Parliamentary by-election held on 18 March 1913. The constituency returned one Member of Parliament (MP) to the House of Commons of the United Kingdom, elected by the first past the post voting system.

Vacancy
Josceline Bagot was twice returned as Conservative MP for Kendal (1892–1906 and 1910–1913), He died on 1 March 1913.

Previous result

Candidates

John Weston was selected by the Unionists to defend the seat.
The Liberals chose local man William Somervell who had stood here last time.

Campaign

Result

Somervell explained his defeat, and the doubling of the Unionist majority,  by claiming that  Weston (who stood as an Independent Unionist) had been elected because he was a ‘semi-Liberal’ and a popular local man.

Aftermath
Somervell was to enter parliament at a by-election in May 1918, holding a Liberal seat.
Following boundary changes, Kendal was merged into the new Westmorland seat for the 1918 elections.

Weston was endorsed by the Coalition Government.

References

 Craig, F. W. S. (1974). British parliamentary election results 1885-1918 (1 ed.). London: Macmillan. 
 Who's Who: www.ukwhoswho.com 
 Debrett's House of Commons 1916

1913 elections in the United Kingdom
1913 in England
20th century in Westmorland
By-elections to the Parliament of the United Kingdom in Cumbria constituencies
By-elections to the Parliament of the United Kingdom in Westmorland constituencies
Kendal